The bauchan (Scottish: bòcan English: bauchan, buckawn or bogan) is a type of domestic hobgoblin in Scottish folklore. It is often mischievous and sometimes dangerous, but is also very helpful when the need arises.

Folklore

John Francis Campbell in his Popular Tales of the West Highlands tells the story of Callum Mor MacIntosh whose farm in Lochaber was haunted by a bauchan. The relationship between Callum and the bauchan was noted as being contradictory in nature. While the bauchan was belligerent and combative, he often provided assistance in various farm-related tasks. When Callum emigrated to New York City the bauchan went with him and helped him clear his new plot of land. In this tale the bauchan is a shapeshifter and is able to transform into a goat.

Fiction

The character "Buckeye" is a bauchan in the fantasy novel The Haunted Wizard (1999) by Christopher Stasheff.

See also

Brownie
Wild man

References

Fairies
Hobgoblins
Scottish folklore
Scottish legendary creatures